The Arshan Formation, also rendered A’ershan , is located in the Inner Mongolia Autonomous Region and is dated to Pleistocene period.

References

Geology of Inner Mongolia
Geologic formations of China